The Northwood Plume Stakes is a registered Melbourne Racing Club Group 3 Thoroughbred horse race for mares four years old and older, run at set weights with penalties, over a distance of 1200 metres at Caulfield Racecourse, Melbourne, Australia in October. Prizemoney is A$200,000.

History
The registered race is named after Northwood Plume, who won the 1994 The Thousand Guineas–VRC Oaks double and was named Champion three-year-old filly that season. The race is held on the first day of the MRC Spring Carnival. 

Since 2010, if the winner of the event has previously won one of the two heats (W W Cockram Stakes or How Now Stakes), then the connections will win a $50,000 bonus from William Hill.

Name
2005 - Thai Airways International Classic
2006 - Northwood Plume Stakes
2007–2008 - Le Tan Stakes
2009 - Northwood Plume Stakes
2010–2014 - Sportingbet Sprint Series Final
2015–2018 - Cape Grim Beef Steaks
2019 - Bass Strait Beef Steaks
2020 - Northwood Plume Stakes

Venue
2005 onwards - Caulfield Racecourse

Grade
2006–2012 - Listed race
2013 onwards - Group 3

Winners 

 2021 - Dirty Thoughts
 2020 - Fiesta
 2019 - Tofane
 2018 - Winter Bride
 2017 - Cool Passion
 2016 - Sheidel
 2015 - Politeness
 2014 - Griante
 2013 - Aerobatics
 2012 - Serena Star
 2011 - Hinemoa
 2010 - Avenue
 2009 - Our Lona
 2008 - Belong To Many
 2007 - Storm Signal
 2006 - Personal Ensign
 2005 - Crimson Reign

See also
 List of Australian Group races
 Group races

References

Horse races in Australia